Gowmazi Sanjar (also Romanized as Gowmāzī Sanjar; also known as Gowmāzī) is a village in Kambel-e Soleyman Rural District, in the Central District of Chabahar County, Sistan and Baluchestan Province, Iran. At the 2006 census, its population was 149, in 22 families.

References 

Populated places in Chabahar County